Operation Repo (formerly known as Operación Repo) is an American television program that depicts the world of car repossession with a team that portrays fictionalized tales of repossessions from California's San Fernando Valley.

Re-enactment and authenticity 
Operation Repo consists of what are purported to be actual stories of repossession incidents; however, the show depicts scripted and dramatized re-enactments in which the cast "recreates" incidents using actors and staged action footage.

Broadcast history 
Operation Repo was first produced in a Spanish-language version, Operación Repo on Telemundo in October 2006, becoming the number-one rated show on the network. The show later crossed over to English-language and moved to truTV, where it started airing on March 31, 2008.

Operation Repo also airs on OLN in Canada and RTL7 in the Netherlands, and on One In Australia. In Spain it airs on Energy, in Norway on Viasat 4, in Italy on Italia 2 and in the United Kingdom it airs on DMAX.

The eleventh season resumed on December 18, 2013 and has concluded, along with the series, on February 5, 2014.

Cast 
Sonia's Team [May 2013 – 2014]
Sonia Pizarro - herself (boss) [2006–2014]
Lyndah Pizarro - herself (Sonia's niece) [2008–2014]
Froylan 'Froy' Tercero - himself (Sonia's ex-husband) [2006-2011, 2011–2014]
Matt Burch - himself (family friend) [2006-2009, 2009-2011, 2011–2014]
Carlos Lopez - himself (new hire) [2012–2014] died 2018
Ronnie Lee - himself (new hire) [2012–2014]

Matt & Froy's Team [2011]
Matt Burch [2011]
Froylan 'Froy' Tercero [2011]

Former Cast
Luis 'Lou' Pizarro - himself (boss, retired in episode 6 of season 11) [2006–2013]
Roberto 'Rob' Pizarro - (Lou's cousin, filled in for Matt & Froy when they temporarily left Lou's team) [2011]
Vanessa Gomez (on the team when the show aired on Telemundo; replaced by Lyndah when the show moved to truTV) [2006–2008]
Mike (joined when Matt left the first time, left while on the show after a dispute with the R.O.) [2009]
Ashley Burch - herself (Matt's daughter, secretly went on repos with Matt.) [2011]
Frankie - himself (came to fill in for Matt & Froy in 2009 and 2012 respectively, fired and arrested for DUI in 2009, fired in 2012 for wrecking a semi and a car) [2009, 2012]

Production 
Tariq Jalil - Executive Producer
Francisco Aguilar - Executive Producer/Director
Luis Pizarro - Executive Producer/Creator
Stephen A. Phillips - Consulting Producer
Angel Annussek - Executive Producer (in association with truTV)
Lars Casteen - Associate Producer (in association with truTV)

References

External links
Operation Repo on TruTV (web archive)

TruTV original programming
2008 American television series debuts
2014 American television series endings
English-language television shows